Phillip Tinney (born 15 January 1945) is a Scottish former professional footballer who played as a winger.

Early and personal life
Tinney was from Dundee, and attended St Stephen's and St John's schools in the city.

Career
Tinney spent his early career with Liverpool and Dundee. He made one first-team appearance for Dundee, in the Summer Cup, where he scored a goal. He then played for Dutch club Heracles, becoming the first British player to score in the Eredivisie. After leaving Heracles in January 1966, he was subject to a five-year FIFA ban for breaking his contract. He subsequently played in the United States for the Philadelphia Spartans and the Dallas Tornado. His career was ended by a broken leg whilst playing for Wigan Athletic. After retiring as a player he worked in residential childcare in Merseyside.

References

1945 births
Living people
Scottish footballers
Liverpool F.C. players
Dundee F.C. players
Heracles Almelo players
Philadelphia Spartans players
Dallas Tornado players
Wigan Athletic F.C. players
Eredivisie players
National Professional Soccer League (1967) players
North American Soccer League (1968–1984) players
Association football wingers
Scottish expatriate footballers
Scottish expatriate sportspeople in the Netherlands
Expatriate footballers in the Netherlands
Scottish expatriate sportspeople in the United States
Expatriate soccer players in the United States